Corentin Le Cam (born 8 June 1999) is a French rugby league footballer who last played as a  forward for the Catalans Dragons in the Super League and France at international level.

In 2021 he made his Catalans debut in the Super League against St Helens.

References

External links
Catalans Dragons profile
France profile

1999 births
Living people
Catalans Dragons players
France national rugby league team players
French rugby league players
French rugby union players
Rugby league second-rows
Whitehaven R.L.F.C. players